Garfield Methodist Church is a historic church at 1302 E. Roosevelt Street in Phoenix, Arizona.

It was built in 1926 in a Mission/Spanish Revival style. It was added to the National Register of Historic Places in 1993. It is currently home to Aim Right Ministries.

The church is a two-story  building designed by local architect Vere Wallingford.  It is built of wire-cut bricks, with a gable roof, on a concrete foundation.  It has a two-story corner entry vestibule resembling a bell tower.

References

External links

 Aim Right Ministries

Churches in Phoenix, Arizona
Methodist churches in Arizona
National Register of Historic Places in Phoenix, Arizona
Churches on the National Register of Historic Places in Arizona
Churches completed in 1926
Mission Revival architecture in Arizona